Loja Saarinen (March 15, 1879 – April 21, 1968) was a Finnish-American textile artist and sculptor who founded the weaving department at the Cranbrook Academy of Art in Michigan. She also led her own studio, the Studio Loja Saarinen, which designed many of the textiles used in buildings designed by her husband, the architect Eliel Saarinen.

Background 
Minna Carolina Mathilde Louise "Loja" Gesellius was born March 16, 1879, in Helsinki, Finland, and studied art at the Helsinki University of Art and Design (1898–99) and Drawing School of the Finnish Art Association (1899–1902), and sculpture under Jean Antoine Injalbert at the Académie Colarossi in Paris.

Career 
Loja Saarinen started her career in 1928 when she founded one of the most productive weaving departments in the United States at the Cranbrook Educational Community. Saarinen was heavily influenced by Swedish craft tradition. She was one of the first artists to bring Scandinavian design to America. Her most substantial work was for Kingswood School where her studio designed tapestries, rugs, curtains, and upholstery.

Saarinen's work is characterized by simple geometric designs in subtle light and dark contrasts, with a frequent use of complementary colors.

One-Person Exhibitions: 
 Architectural League of New York, 1931
 Detroit Institute of Arts, 1932
 Norfolk Museum of Arts and Sciences, 1937
 Cincinnati Museum of Art, 1938
 Toledo Museum of Art, 1938
 Berea College, 1943
 Jacques Seligmann Gallery, New York City 1957 (two-person)
 Cranbrook Academy of Art, 1980

References 

1879 births
1968 deaths
Cranbrook Educational Community
Artists from Helsinki
Finnish emigrants to the United States
American weavers
Finnish textile artists
Artists from Michigan
American women sculptors
Sculptors from Michigan
Women textile artists
Finnish women sculptors